The 2013 Charlotte Eagles Season will be the club's 21st year of professional soccer.  It will be the team's third consecutive season in the USL Professional Division and the team will look to build on its 2012 Open Cup run from a year ago where they reached the quarterfinals.

Background

Current roster
As of Feb 28. 2013

Competition

USL PRO

Results summary

Match Results

USL Pro Playoffs

US Open Cup

Match Results

References

Charlotte Eagles
Charlotte Eagles seasons
Charlotte Eagles